Gerard Ciarcia (born 23 October 1956) is an Italian ice hockey player. He competed in the men's tournament at the 1984 Winter Olympics.

References

External links
 

1956 births
Living people
Olympic ice hockey players of Italy
Ice hockey players at the 1984 Winter Olympics
Ice hockey people from Boston